The Venucia D60 is a compact four door sedan produced by Chinese auto maker Venucia, a subsidiary of Dongfeng Motor Co., Ltd.

Overview
The Venucia D60 debuted in China in late 2017, and is based on the Nissan Sylphy sedan produced by the Dongfeng-Nissan joint venture. The Venucia D60 compact sedan is powered by the HR16 1.6 liter engine mated to a 5-speed manual transmission or CVT gearbox. Prices of the Venucia D60 starts from 69,800 yuan to 111,800 yuan.

2019 facelift
A minor facelift was launched in 2019 featuring a redesigned front fascia previewed by the Venucia D60EV revealed in April 2019. The update features an updated grille inspired by Venucia concepts at the time.

Venucia D60 Plus
A major facelift dubbed the D60 Plus was launched for the 2021 model year, featuring a completely redesigned front end in the same style as the Venucia Xing. The power configuration of the D60 Plus remains to be the original Nissan-sourced technology, the HR16 1.6 liter engine mated to a 5-speed manual transmission or CVT gearbox.

Venucia D60EV

The Venucia D60EV is the electric version of the Venucia D60 sedan. It was revealed during the 2019 Shanghai Auto Show alongside the T60EV electric crossover, and available to the market in September 2019. The D60EV is equipped with a ternary lithium battery pack with a capacity of 58kWh, and the cruising range is  under the NEDC standard.

Based on the D60, the D60EV been completely redesigned in the position of front grille, the lower bumper, fog lights, and rear bumper. The D60EV design previews the following D60 facelift. For the D60EV, the closed front grille design has become the standard for new energy vehicles, and the arrow-shaped fog light design is the most significant update of the entire fascia. The D60EV is offered in three trim levels, with a price range of 137,800 to 153,800 yuan (~US$19,185 – US$21,412).

References

External links 

 

D60
Compact cars
Cars introduced in 2017
Front-wheel-drive vehicles
Vehicles with CVT transmission
Sedans
Cars of China
Production electric cars